Come My Way is the second studio album by English singer Marianne Faithfull. It was released simultaneously with her album Marianne Faithfull on 15 April 1965 by Decca Records. The double release was a result of different creative directions. While the record label pressed Faithfull to record a pop album, she wanted to record an album of folk songs. Even after the label suggested an album containing both genres, Faithfull decided to make two separate albums instead; Marianne Faithfull as the pop album and Come My Way as the folk album.

The album was arranged by acoustic guitarist Jon Mark. Martin Haines was the engineer. The cover photography is by Gered Mankowitz and the design is by Chris O'Dell. It was taken in The Salisbury public house, Covent Garden, London. Keith Richards played acoustic guitar on both sides of the "Blowin' in the Wind"/"House of the Rising Sun" single released on October 23, 1964.

Track listing

Charts

Notes

References

External links 
 [ Come My Way] at AllMusic
 

1965 albums
Marianne Faithfull albums
Albums produced by Tony Calder
Decca Records albums
Albums recorded at IBC Studios